Anthony Brook is a former New Zealand rower.

At the 1982 World Rowing Championships at Rotsee, Switzerland, he won a gold medal with the New Zealand eight in seat seven.

In 1982, the 1982 rowing eight crew was named sportsman of the year. The 1982 team was inducted into the New Zealand Sports Hall of Fame in 1995.

References

Year of birth missing (living people)
New Zealand male rowers
Living people
World Rowing Championships medalists for New Zealand